Haldimand—Norfolk—Brant was a provincial electoral district in central Ontario, Canada that elected one Member of the Legislative Assembly of Ontario. It was created in 1999 from Norfolk and Brant—Haldimand. It was abolished in 2007 into Haldimand—Norfolk and Brant.

The riding included all of Norfolk County, plus the town of Haldimand, the townships of Burford, Oakland and Onondaga plus the Indian reserves of New Credit and Six Nations.

Members of Provincial Parliament 

Toby Barrett, Ontario Progressive Conservative Party (1999–2007)

Election results 

Former provincial electoral districts of Ontario
1999 establishments in Ontario
2007 disestablishments in Ontario

fr:Haldimand—Norfolk—Brant (circonscription provinciale)